Wallat is a surname. Notable people with the surname include:

Hans Wallat (1929–2014), German conductor
Paul Wallat (1879–1964), German landscape artist, draftsman and sculptor
Stefan Wallat (born 1987), German rower

See also
Wallas (disambiguation)